Frances Bulwark (born 5 April 1945) was a Swedish Standardbred racing trotter and brood mare by Bulwark out of Frances Great by Kaffir Axworthy.

Her most prestigious victories include six Swedish Championships (1950–51, 1953–56), five Scandinavian Championships (1950, 1952-1955), Åby Stora Pris (1950), Gran Premio delle Nazioni (1952) and Elitloppet (1953). At the end of her career, the mare had earned SEK591,420. Frances Bulwark was trained by successful Swedish trainer Sören Nordin, with whom the mare won 74 races, more than any other of Nordin's horses. Nordin considered Frances Bulwark to be the best among the horses he trained during his career.

Pedigree

References

External links

Swedish standardbred racehorses
Elitlopp winners